First Minister's Questions (FMQs) is the name given to the weekly questioning of the First Minister in the Scottish Parliament. It serves the purpose of holding the Scottish Government to account and the format has evolved over time. First Minister's Questions follows in some of the traditions of Prime Minister's Questions in the House of Commons. Other devolved administrations in the United Kingdom also have sessions for the question times of their leaders that take the same name. An independent report published in 2017 suggested further reforms.

Procedure and format
There are rules and procedures about who can submit a question. The Presiding Officer selects questions from all of those lodged by Members of the Scottish Parliament (MSPs).

History
In 2000, during the 1st Scottish Parliament, the procedures committee recommended that a specific First Minister’s Question Time be set up, to last for up to twenty minutes out of the hour set aside for the questioning of Ministers. There were lively encounters between the First Minister, Donald Dewar and the then Leader of the Opposition, Alex Salmond. The Parliament's first Presiding Officer Sir David Steel had reservations about the format, describing it as "something of a caricature of Prime Minister’s Question Time”.

While First Minister, Jack McConnell expressed views about seeing changes to how the Scottish Parliament functioned. In May 2003, at the beginning of the 2nd Scottish Parliament, McConnell wrote to Presiding Officer George Reid, to ask for various changes in how business was conducted in the Scottish Parliament. He requested a shake-up of FMQs, including the session being held earlier in the day as school parties visiting Parliament often had to leave before the end of the session. He also wished for FMQs to run for longer and allowing back-benchers to be given more time to ask supplementary questions. He sought for the leaders of the Greens and the Scottish Socialist Party to be allocated to ask questions every two weeks, after their parties made electoral gains. In a written response, Reid proposed extending the length of FMQs from twenty to thirty minutes. In January 2004, FMQs was moved to midday, from a 3.10pm slot. The BBC reported an initial fall in viewing figures following the move. The numbers of questions asked varied, with some leaders speaking at length, which left few opportunities for back-bench politicians to ask questions.

In May 2011, as the 4th Scottish Parliament got underway, Presiding Officer Tricia Marwick announced changes to give backbench MSPs more involvement. This quickly resulted in the shortest exchange at FMQs between the First Minister and the Leader of the Opposition since early 2007, with eleven back-benchers asking questions or supplementaries.

In May 2016, at the start of the 5th Scottish Parliament, MSPs approved a trial period where the length of the session was extended to 45 minutes. The longer sessions were seen as a positive move, with the atmosphere less rushed and more opportunities being given to backbenchers. In June 2017 the Commission on Parliamentary Reform reported and considered FMQs as part of this. There were recommendations around the effective use of chamber time, included ceasing the practice of using scripted diary questions from party leaders to open First Minister’s Questions (FMQs). The report suggested scrapping the requirement for selected questions to be published ahead of the session and granting the Presiding Officer the power to rule out questions "which do other than seek to genuinely scrutinise the minister".

Previous leaders involved in First Minister's Questions
Alex Salmond was Scotland's longest-serving First Minister and appeared in this role at 215 FMQ sessions, facing ten opposition party leaders (or interim leaders) over that time.

References

External links
 Tickets for First Minister's Question Time at Scottish Parliament website
 Episode guide on BBC Parliament website

Scottish Parliament